In computing, a screen of death (commonly called the blue screen of death) is an informal term for a type of computer operating system error message displayed onscreen when the system has experienced a fatal system error. Computer users have dubbed these messages "screens of death" because they typically result in unsaved work being lost and often indicate serious problems with the system's hardware or software. These error screens are usually the result of a kernel panic, although the terms are frequently used interchangeably. Most screens of death are displayed on an even background color with a message advising the user to restart the computer.

Notable screens of death 

 The Blue Screen of Death (also called BSoD, or stop error) is a common name for a screen displayed by the Microsoft Windows operating system when a critical system error occurs. By far, this is the most famous screen of death.

 Black Screens of Death are used by several systems: One is a failure mode of Windows 3.x. One appears when the bootloader for Windows Vista and later fails. Also in Windows 11 previews the Blue Screen of Death was changed to black.

 A Green Screen of Death is a green screen that appears on a TiVo with a message that includes the words "the DVR has detected a serious problem and is now attempting to fix it" or "A severe error has occurred". Its appearance often means that the hard drive is corrupted and it will attempt to clean up, check, and/or repair the TiVo Media File System. A Blue Screen of Death on a Windows Insider build appears as green instead of blue, starting with build 14997. A Green Screen of Death also appears on the Xbox One and PlayStation 5.

 The Purple Screen of Death is used by VMware ESXi, a server virtualization product by VMware, Inc. It is displayed in the event of a fatal kernel error. The screen provides error codes that can be used for debugging purposes.

 Four Red Screens of Death are used by different systems: One appears in early beta versions of Windows Vista, but it later became a black screen. Another appeared in Windows 98 beta builds and is caused by Advanced Configuration and Power Interface (ACPI). It also appears on the Atari Jaguar System if there is a loading cartridge error or a pirated cartridge is detected, marked by the sound of a roaring jaguar and a red Atari Jaguar logo on a screen that changes color from black to red. And the last one is the PlayStation 2's Red Screen of Death, it is very similar to the PS2 startup screen, except after the startup, a red screen appears with a message saying "Please insert a PlayStation or PlayStation 2 format disc." The sound at the start of the Red Screen is actually a low pitched version of PS2 menu screen with a creepy whistle and then the ambient sounds like the menu. This error can be obtained by inserting a non-compatible disc/game disc e.g., a PC disc and later Xbox 360 discs with the new banner.

 A White Screen of Death appears on several other operating systems, content management systems and BIOSes. One is in iOS 7, and the screen of death appears when a white iPhone 5 or later or a white iPod Touch (5th generation) is frozen. Everything on the screen goes white, and a black Apple logo is all that's displayed on the screen.

 A Yellow Screen of Death occurs when an ASP.NET web app encounters a problem and crashes.

 A kernel panic is used primarily by Unix and Unix-like operating systems: the Unix equivalent of Microsoft's Blue Screen of Death. It is a routine called when the kernel detects irrecoverable errors in runtime correctness; in  other words, when continued operation may risk escalating system instability, and a system reboot is easier than attempted recovery.

 A Sad Mac is a symbol used by older-generation Apple Macintosh computers, starting with the original Macintosh 128K, to indicate a severe hardware or software problem that prevented startup from occurring successfully. A similar symbol exists for the iPod.

 A Sad Tab is an icon featuring a frowning folder displayed on a tab in Google Chrome when that tab crashes. The symbol  shares the face of the Sad Mac.

 The Bomb icon is a symbol that was displayed when a classic Mac OS  program had an application crash. The bomb symbols were also used by the Atari ST line of computers when the system encountered a fatal system error. The number of bombs indicated the exact cause of the error.

 Guru Meditation is the name of the error that occurred on early versions of the Amiga computers when they crashed. It was also used on the Nintendo DS, most commonly seen when using homebrew. (The top screen was black, and the bottom screen was red with white debug font saying "Guru Meditation Error! data abort!" with some hex addresses below it.)

 Kernel Debug Land is the name of the Kernel Debugger users of Haiku/BeOS are dropped into when a kernel crash is experienced.

See also 

 Kill screen
 Xbox 360 technical problems (Common name for a hardware error is the 'Red Ring of Death')

References 

 
Computer errors
Internet memes introduced in the 1990s